Annabelle Davis Clinton Imber Tuck (born July 15, 1950) is an American lawyer who served as an associate justice of the Arkansas Supreme Court for thirteen years. The first woman elected to the Arkansas Supreme Court, Imber is best known for a case she handled while she was a chancery judge in the 6th Judicial District (Perry and Pulaski counties).

Early life and career
Tuck was born in Heber Springs, Arkansas and spent early years in Bolivia and Brazil as her father moved for jobs within the International Cooperation Administration. She later moved to the Washington metropolitan area, living with family and attending Prince George's County Public Schools, graduating from Crossland High School. Imber received her undergraduate degree from Smith College in Northampton, Massachusetts and her Juris Doctor degree from the University of Arkansas at Little Rock while working as a paralegal.

Prior to taking the bench, Imber was in private practice for several years with the Little Rock law firm of Wright, Lindsey & Jennings. In 1984, Governor Bill Clinton (no relation to her then-husband) appointed her to a vacant criminal division judgeship on the Pulaski County Circuit Court. 

In 1988, she was elected chancery and probate judge for Pulaski and Perry counties.

In 1994, she issued a landmark ruling in the school-funding case filed by the tiny Lake View School District that declared the state was violating the Arkansas Constitution by funding districts inequitably.

Supreme Court
Imber was elected to the Supreme Court in 1997 without opposition, after serving eight years as an elected chancery and probate court judge for Pulaski and Perry counties. She was reelected twice. On September 10, 2009, Imber announced plans to retire from the bench. She retired January 1, 2010.

References

External links
 Interview for the Arkansas Supreme Court Historical Society

1950 births
Living people
20th-century American women judges
20th-century American judges
21st-century American women judges
21st-century American judges
American women judges
American women lawyers
Arkansas state court judges
Justices of the Arkansas Supreme Court
Smith College alumni
University of Arkansas at Little Rock alumni